Pallickal is a panchayath in Varkala Taluk of Trivandrum district in the state of Kerala, India. It is situated 18km east of Varkala along Varkala - Madathara State Highway 64 and 46km north-east of capital city Trivandrum. It is known for its lush paddy fields and Land of Volleyball in south kerala. More over, this village is full of Sports enthusiasts and supporters.

Attractions

Pallickal is famous for the sports called " Maramadi" or [[Bull surfing|Bull Surfing

There are many temples in this village. They are Kodimarathinmood Devi Temple,Panappallil Bhagavathi Temple, Chazhoor Mahavishnu Temple, Pulimath Devei Temple, Anakunnam Mahadeva temple,Ayiravilli Mahadeva Temple, Ilamabarakkod Devi Temple,  Parayil Sreedharmasastha temple, Mannavil Moorthi temple, Thevermukalil Ardha Nareerswara Temple, Pakalkkuri Maha Vishnu Temple, and the newly made Sree Narayana Gurudeve Temple at Moothala. There are five mosques in this village. One is situated in Pallickal town itself, which is recently renovated and Thazhebhagom Muslim Jamaath is one of the oldest mosques in this area.

Sports 
Pallickal is called " Home of Volleyball " in Kerala. Jas club Pallickal molded a lot of stars to State, National and even International Levels . Akhin Gs (India men's national volleyball team ), 22-year-old was a key player of the triumphant Tamil Nadu team at the recently concluded 62nd senior national volleyball championship in Uttar Pradesh

Schools 
 Govt. High School, Pallickal
 Govt. U.P School, Pallickal
 Pakalkuri Higher Secondary School
 Moothala LP School
 Kattuputhusseri LP School

References

Villages in Thiruvananthapuram district